LÖVE is a free, open-source, cross-platform framework released under the zlib license for developing 2D video games. The framework is written in C++ and uses Lua as its scripting language and is still maintained by its original developers.

The API provided by the framework gives access to the video and sound functions of the host machine through the libraries SDL and OpenGL, or since version 0.10 also OpenGL ES 2 and 3. Fonts can be rendered by the FreeType engine. A version of the framework called piLöve has been specifically ported to Raspberry Pi.

The framework is frequently found in the compositions of video game development competitions, such as the game development competition Ludum Dare. In July 2018, it was the 10th most popular game development software used by independent game developers on the site Itch.io, holding a 1.97% share.

History

Features 
These features come with the framework:
 support of OpenGL pixel shaders GLSL,
 touchscreen support,
 joystick support
 support for UTF-8,
 supports image formats: PNG, JPEG, GIF, TGA and BMP,
 supports audio formats: WAV, OGG, and MP3
 supports video formats: OGV
 supports using the 2D physics engine Box2D (can be disabled, to lighten the library),
 luasocket library for network communications TCP/UDP,
 lua-enet library, another network library implementing Enet, a reliable protocol based on UDP
 provides a basic "sandbox" management of the files in order to avoid giving access to all its disk to the executed games.

Additional Libraries & Implementations 
There are various libraries and forks of Löve to improve basic functions, such as object-oriented programming with inheritance and overloading, interpolations, camera management, network multiplayer management, game state management, configuration, etc.

 The Simple Tiled Implementation library allows users to load levels as tiles, edit using Tiled and display them in games. It works in conjunction with Box2D for collision management with this decor.
 The anim8 library allows users to load animations, for characters for example, from an image grid into a bitmap file (PNG or JPEG).
 There is a free platform (GPLv3) called LIKO-12, inspired by the PICO-8 fantasy console and using Löve, allowing to develop applications in a limited resolution, backup/restore in the modified PNG format, in the same way as the video game cartridges of the game consoles or some of the first microcomputers, and export them to HTML5 or to systems supported by Löve.
 Lutro is a Lua game framework for libretro, a partial port of the Löve API. ChaiLove follows a similar path by offering an implementation in ChaiScript, an embedded and cross-platform scripting language for C++ (C++14).
 love.js is a port of Löve that aims to make it possible to run Löve games on the web via HTML5, WebGL, and Emscripten. 
 g3d is a 3D engine that simplifies 3D capabilities in LÖVE, it allows for: 3D model rendering, .obj file loading, first person movement and camera controls, perspective and orthographic projections, 3D collisions, etc.

References

External links 
 
 

Video game development software
Cross-platform software
Free computer libraries
Software using the zlib license